The Stockton Symphony Association is an American orchestra based in Stockton, California.  It was founded in 1926 by Manlio Silva and is the third oldest orchestra in California. Since 1995 Peter Jaffe has been music director and conductor.

Concert halls
The symphony performs at the Atherton Auditorium of San Joaquin Delta College in Stockton, California.

External links
 Stockton Symphony Website
 Harmony Stockton Project Website
 Stockton Symphony's Steppin' Out School Concerts Website
 Stockton Symphony's Facebook Page
 Stockton Symphony Twitter Account

References

Read More: 
 NPR Music Article: A Struggling City Finds Inspiration in Classical Music (March 7, 2012)
 San Francisco Classical Voice: Stockton Symphony Engages City with New Music (March 13, 2012)
 League of American Orchestras - Summer Issue of Symphony Magazine: Orchestras Across the Country Are Taking on Challenging Roles Outside the Concert Hall (July 23, 2012)

Musical groups established in 1926
Tourist attractions in San Joaquin County, California
Culture of Stockton, California
Orchestras based in California